Wilhelmina "Minie" Brinkhoff (born 19 December 1952) is a retired Dutch cyclist who was active between 1970 and 1978. She won a bronze medal in the road race at the 1977 UCI Road World Championships as well as two national track sprint titles, in 1972 and 1974. After marrying Dutch cyclist Peter Nieuwenhuis she changed her last name to Brinkhof-Nieuwenhuis.

References

1952 births
Living people
Dutch female cyclists
People from Zevenaar
UCI Road World Championships cyclists for the Netherlands
Cyclists from Gelderland
20th-century Dutch women
21st-century Dutch women